Timmins Transit provides public transportation services to the City of Timmins in north eastern Ontario, Canada. The system is operated as a department of the City of Timmins, which also owns and operates the Timmins/Victor M. Power Airport. Over the past few years, after a decade of decline, Timmins Transit has experienced some of the fastest ridership growth in the country.

Services

Scheduled routes 
Most of the regularly scheduled routes, like many small cities, connect at the centrally located transit terminal transfer point.

Daytime & Saturday service
 5 Westmount
 9 Schumacher
 16 South Porcupine/Porcupine
 31 Howard/Brousseau
 32 Lee/Rea South
 36 Porcupine Community
 37 Riverside-Melrose: service to The Home Depot via Riverside;return via Park Ave & Melrose
 38 Melrose-Riverside: service to the Home Depot via Melrose and Park ave; return via Riverside

Evening & Sunday service
 6 Riverside 
 7 Park Avenue
 901 Porcupine East-West
 902 Timmins North-South

Handy-Transit 
Service is provided by fully accessible minibus for those with disabilities who cannot use the regular bus transit service. As a prerequisite clients must register and be approved to use this service.

Facilities

Office and Garage 
 Address: 171 Iroquois Road, Timmins
 Facilities: Administration offices, bus maintenance, body and paint shop and storage for the entire bus fleet
 Coordinates:

Timmins Transit Terminal 
This building, originally the T&NO Railway Station, also serves as Ontario Northland's intercity bus terminal.
 Address: 54 Spruce Street South, Timmins
 Facilities: waiting area, wicket, drivers' area, dispatching 
 Coordinates:

Schumacher 
 Address: 41 Father Costello Drive, Schumacher
 Facilities: waiting area leased from Schumacher Bus Lines Ltd.
 Coordinates:

South Porcupine 
 Address: 73 Main Street, South Porcupine
 Facilities: small waiting area, at the Maurice Londry Community Centre
 Coordinates:

Fleet 
More than half of the full sized buses and all of the minibuses are fully accessible vehicles. Over the next few years plans call for older vehicles to be replaced with accessible, low floor transit buses. 

Several of the buses have been personalized by naming them, just like ship names.
34 - Spirit of Schumacher
74 - Spirit of South Porcupine
75 - Spirit of Victoria
79 - Spirit of Porcupine
80 - Spirit of Northern Ontario
82 - Spirit of St. Eustache
83 - Spirit of Guildford
84 - Spirit of North Bay
85 - Spirit of Timmins

History
Commuter bus services in the Timmins area were operated by John Dalton from about 1926. Another early company, Hamilton and Dwyer, operated an hourly service from Timmins to Schumacher with a fleet of two buses. 

The ancestry of those enterprises is carried on today under the banner of Schumacher Bus Lines Ltd, operating out of the Dwyer building on First Avenue, with school bus and bus charter services, and Dalton's Bus Line Ltd, on Dalton Road, providing similar services. Timmins, in 1975, was the last of Northern Ontario's five major cities to get public transit, which previously had been a privately run service subsidized by the city.

See also

 Public transport in Canada

References

External links 
 Timmins Transit official website
 Drawings and photos of Timmins Transit buses

Transit agencies in Ontario
Bus transport in Ontario
Paratransit services in Canada
Transport in Timmins
1976 establishments in Ontario
Canadian companies established in 1976